Reese Fork is a stream in Audrain, Monroe  and
Randolph counties the U.S. state of Missouri. It is a tributary to Allen Creek.

The stream flows east into northwestern Audrain County then turns to the northeast and enters Monroe County. The stream enters Allen Creek adjacent to Missouri Route 151 six miles south of Madison.

Reese Fork has the name of an early settler.

See also
List of rivers of Missouri

References

Rivers of Audrain County, Missouri
Rivers of Monroe County, Missouri
Rivers of Randolph County, Missouri
Rivers of Missouri